Luis Amado García (born January 30, 1987) is a Dominican professional baseball pitcher for the San Diego Padres of Major League Baseball (MLB). He previously played for the Philadelphia Phillies, Los Angeles Angels, Texas Rangers and St. Louis Cardinals.

García was originally signed by the Los Angeles Dodgers organization as an amateur free agent in 2004, at the age of 16. His initial MLB call-up occurred on July 9, 2013. García made his big league debut the next day, versus the Washington Nationals at Citizens Bank Park. That day, he pitched one scoreless inning, in relief of Phillies ace, Cliff Lee.

During the period in between stints, García was mostly out of baseball, working in the barbering and moving businesses, save for a brief, rocky  comeback attempt in independent ball.

Professional career

Early professional career (2006–10)
He remained in the Dodgers organization until ; on August 31, García was traded to the Washington Nationals along with a player to be named later (Victor Garate), for infielder Ronnie Belliard. In total in 2009, García had six wins, three losses, with a 2.76 earned run average (ERA), and five saves, with the Great Lakes Loons and Potomac Nationals. He spent the  season in the Nationals organization before being granted free agency.

Philadelphia Phillies

After spending 2011 out of baseball and in  pitching only nine games for the Newark Bears of the Can-Am League during which he totaled an 11.57 ERA, García assumed his professional career was over, and began trying to learn the trade of barbering at a salon in New Jersey. At night, he worked at a moving company.

At that time, García’s only baseball activity was teaching children and a few pickup games, yet Phillies international scouting director Sal Agostinelli heard about García and sent someone to watch him throw. After discovering that García consistently threw a fastball that was 94 miles per hour (mph) as well as an "impressive" slider, Agostinelli had García come to Phillies spring training. The Phillies signed him to a minor league contract and assigned him to the Clearwater Threshers, their Advanced-A affiliate, on March 25, 2013. Agostinelli was quoted as saying, "It's literally one of those things as a scout that you dream about."

Despite his accolades from the scouting staff, García was not expected to reach the majors. Beginning the year in Clearwater before earning promotions to the Double-A Reading Fightin Phils and the Triple-A Lehigh Valley IronPigs, García combined to post a 1.67 ERA and 9.3 strikeouts per nine innings pitched (K/9). He was called up to the Major Leagues on July 9, 2013, to replace Phillippe Aumont.

García was recalled from Lehigh Valley on May 8, 2014 and had several stints with the Phillies that season, ultimately appearing in 13 games. In , García made the Phillies' Opening Day roster after a strong spring training. His performance during the first half of the season was characterized as "inconsistent" by then-interim manager Pete Mackanin, who said García had been hanging too many sliders.

In , García was 3–1, with one save, in 59 games (all in relief), with a 6.07 ERA, a 1.46 WHIP, and 51 strikeouts in 46 innings.

Los Angeles Angels
On December 6, 2018, the Phillies traded García to the Los Angeles Angels for relief pitcher José Álvarez. García would make 64 appearances for the Angels in 2019, posting a 2–1 record and 4.35 ERA. García elected free agency following the 2019 season.

Texas Rangers
On January 9, 2020, Garcia signed a minor league deal with the Texas Rangers that included an invite to Spring Training. On August 18, 2020, Garcia was selected to the major league roster. On September 15, Garcia was designated for assignment after struggling to a 7.56 ERA in 11 games. Garcia was granted free agency on September 17.

New York Yankees
On December 12, 2020, García signed a minor league contract with the New York Yankees organization. He was assigned to the Triple-A Scranton/Wilkes-Barre RailRiders to begin the 2021 season. In 18 appearances with Scranton, García logged a 1–2 record and 3.63 ERA. He was granted his released by the Yankees on July 6.

St. Louis Cardinals
On July 9, 2021, García signed a major league contract with the St. Louis Cardinals. García debuted for the Cardinals against the Chicago Cubs on the same day and hit the first batter he faced, Willson Contreras, in the head with a fastball.

San Diego Padres
On December 1, 2021, García signed a two-year contract with the San Diego Padres.

References

External links

1987 births
Living people
Clearwater Threshers players
Dominican Republic expatriate baseball players in the United States
Dominican Summer League Dodgers players
Estrellas Orientales players
Great Lakes Loons players
Gulf Coast Dodgers players
Hagerstown Suns players
Lehigh Valley IronPigs players
Los Angeles Angels players
Major League Baseball pitchers
Major League Baseball players from the Dominican Republic
Newark Bears players
Ogden Raptors players
Philadelphia Phillies players
Potomac Nationals players
Reading Fightin Phils players
San Diego Padres players
Scranton/Wilkes-Barre RailRiders players
Sportspeople from Santo Domingo
St. Louis Cardinals players
Texas Rangers players
2023 World Baseball Classic players